This is a list of Hawaiian composers:

King Lunalilo (wrote lyrics to "E Ola Ke Alii Ke Akua")
King Kalakaua (wrote lyrics to "Hawaii Ponoii")
Queen Liliuokalani (wrote 165 compositions)

Hawaiian music
Lists of composers by nationality
composers